The 2010 Ukrainian Super Cup became the seventh edition of Ukrainian Super Cup, which is an annual football exhibition game contested by the winners of the previous season's Ukrainian Top League and Ukrainian Cup competitions.

The match was played on 4 July 2010 in Zaporizhia at the Slavutych Arena which was completely rebuilt four years before.

This year the Super Cup was contested by league winner Shakhtar Donetsk and cup winner Tavriya Simferopol. Shakhtar won it by thrashing Crimeans 7–1.

Match

Details

2010
2010–11 in Ukrainian football
FC Shakhtar Donetsk matches
SC Tavriya Simferopol matches
Sport in Zaporizhzhia